Jasmine Moran Children's Museum is a children's museum in Seminole, Oklahoma, United States. Melvin Moran is the co-founder of the museum.

The museum is a member of the Oklahoma Museum Network.

References

External links

Jasmine Moran Children's Museum info, photos and video on TravelOK.com Official travel and tourism website for the State of Oklahoma
Voices of Oklahoma interview with Melvin & Jasmine Moran. First person interview conducted on August 19, 2010, with Melvin & Jasmine Moran. 
Children's museums in Oklahoma
Museums in Seminole County, Oklahoma